Jens Otto Krag (15 September 1914 – 22 June 1978) was a Danish politician who served as prime minister of Denmark from 1962 to 1968 and from 1971 to 1972, and as leader of the Social Democrats from 1962 to 1972. He was president of the Nordic Council in 1971.

Early life and career
Krag was born in Randers, Jutland, on 15 September 1914, into the impoverished family of a tobacconist. He attended the local gymnasium, and as a teenager joined the Social Democratic Youth of Denmark, the youth wing of the Social Democratic Party. In 1933, Krag began studying economics at the University of Copenhagen. During this period he emerged as an active journalist and teacher in the labour movement, and became acquainted with the leadership of the Social Democrats and the trade unions.

He received his degree in 1940, the same year that Denmark was invaded by Nazi Germany. During the German occupation, Krag worked as a civil servant in a Danish government agency and became a leading economic advisor to the labour movement, as well as a protégé of prominent social democrat and future prime minister Hans Hedtoft.

Political career 

In 1944, Krag began his political career as the secretary of a program committee set up by the Social Democratic Party, as it prepared itself for politics in the postwar period. Under his leadership, the committee developed the new party program "Denmark of the Future", which presented proposals for nationalisation and notions of Keynesian economics and economic democracy. Despite the party's poor performance in the first postwar election in 1945, Krag and the new party program of the Social Democrats achieved notoriety in Danish politics.

Member of Folketing 
Krag was elected to Parliament (Folketing) in 1947 and was appointed Minister of Commerce. He supported the strengthening of the Danish military and Danish membership of NATO in 1949.

In 1950 Krag resigned from Parliament partially due to a conflict with Vilhelm Buhl and H. C. Hansen and, in order to become more fluent in the English language and see more of the world, requested a position at the Danish embassy in the United States. He received the position, and was in America until 1953 when he was re-elected to parliament and became a minister without portfolio. He was minister of the new department of foreign economic affairs from 1953 until 1958 and Foreign Minister from 1958 until 1962.

Prime Minister 

In September 1962 he succeeded Viggo Kampmann as Prime Minister and leader of the Danish Social Democratic Party. He was Prime Minister until February 1968 when the Social Democrats lost power. He became Prime Minister again in 1971 when his party returned to power. Less than a year into his first term as prime minister, the opposition held a referendum which rejected a set of land laws already passed by Krag's government.

During his second term as Prime Minister, Krag campaigned particularly for European cooperation and unity. He sponsored a referendum for Denmark to join the European Economic Community. In 1972 the referendum passed, but the nation was divided over the issue, and Krag resigned, claiming that he had become tired of politics. His last role in public life was as the European Common Market representative to the United States from 1974 until 1975.

In social policy, a number of progressive reforms were implemented during Krag's time as Prime Minister. Under the New Care of Children and Juveniles Act of May 1964, local child and juvenile welfare committees were authorized to grant cash benefits to certain families with children, to avoid placing children in the care of the Municipal Social Welfare Offices. New criteria for day-care institutions stressing social, educational, and therapeutic aspects were also introduced, and municipalities were obliged to provide facilities for day-care and other related services. Under the Employment Service and Unemployment Insurance Act of February 1967, unemployment benefits were raised and indexed to the official wage index and waiting times were abolished. In addition, an accident insurance act of December 1964 indexed benefits. The Basic Education Act of April 1972 extended compulsory basic education from 7 to 9 years. while A law passed in June 1972 introduced a new scheme for daily cash benefits in cases of sickness and maternity. In 1964, a supplementary pension scheme was established, together with universal child allowances in 1967.

Legacy 
In Denmark, Krag is widely recognized as one of the greatest Danish politicians of all time. He was in the front line of politics for 25 years, holding high ministerial offices for most of that time. He managed to raise Denmark's profile on the world stage, striking up strong relationships with fellow European leaders as well as American presidents Kennedy and Johnson. His list of political achievements is also one of the most impressive, overseeing one of the longest periods of economic expansion in Danish history. However, his largest achievement, and the one he himself was most proud of, was taking Denmark into the European Economic Community in 1973. With that task accomplished he felt he could retire at a high point.

Krag was at one and the same time one of the most charismatic and withdrawn Danish politicians ever. He never enjoyed the attention to which he had to subject himself, and many people found him rather arrogant. According to his most thorough (and quite sympathetic) biographer (Bo Lidegaard, Krag I-II, 2001/2002) he never truly settled into the role as a politician, always considering himself on the way 'to somewhere else'. He had always dreamed of holding the position of governor of the National Bank of Denmark. Only when he had definitively quit politics in 1972 did he realise that he would not be able to achieve this goal.

In the Danish TV series Krøniken (2004–2006) he was portrayed by the actor Lars Mikkelsen.

Private life 
Krag had a difficult private life. He was married twice and had a son (Jens Christian born 1960) and a daughter, Astrid Helene "Søsser" (1962–2014), by his second wife, the famous actress Helle Virkner, but also another child outside of wedlock. Both his marriages ended in divorce, largely due to his own infidelity. During his time in politics, he already struggled with alcoholism, an addiction that became more pronounced after his retirement. He died of heart failure in Skiveren, Denmark at the age of 63.

He was an atheist.

References

Further reading
 Wilsford, David, ed. Political leaders of contemporary Western Europe: a biographical dictionary (Greenwood, 1995) pp. 253–59.

1914 births
1978 deaths
Danish atheists
People from Randers
University of Copenhagen alumni
Foreign ministers of Denmark
Members of the Folketing
Prime Ministers of Denmark
Burials at Vestre Cemetery, Copenhagen
20th-century Danish politicians
Leaders of the Social Democrats (Denmark)